Coleophora nigridorsella is a moth of the family Coleophoridae. It is found in Greece, North Macedonia, southern Russia and the Palestinian Territories.

References

nigridorsella
Moths described in 1935
Moths of Europe
Moths of Asia